Etsha 6 is a village in Ngamiland West sub-district of North-West District, Botswana. The population was 5,613 in the 2001 census.

References 

Villages in Botswana
North-West District (Botswana)